Mary Ann Hanusa (born May 26, 1963) is an American politician who served as a member of the Iowa House of Representatives from 2011 to 2021.

Early life and education 
Hanusa was born, raised, and resides in Council Bluffs, Iowa. She earned a Bachelor of Science degree in education from Concordia Teachers College and an Master of Arts in American history from the University of Nebraska–Lincoln.

Career 
Before election to the Iowa House, she served on the staff of Senator Charles Grassley before becoming director of the White House Office of Presidential Correspondence under George W. Bush, serving from 2001 to 2006. She was the Republican candidate for Iowa Secretary of State in 2006, replacing previous nominee Chuck Allison, who dropped out of the race after the primary.

In the Iowa House, Hanusa served on the Education, Labor, and Local Government committees. She also served as the chair of the Economic Growth Committee and as a member of the Economic Development Appropriations Subcommittee.

Hanusa was a candidate in the Republican primary for the 2022 election in Iowa's 3rd congressional district before withdrawing from the race. In January 2022, Hanusa announced that she would challenge incumbent Rob Sand for Iowa State Auditor in the 2022 elections. Todd Halbur, a small business owner, defeated Hanusa in the primary election.

References

External links

 Representative Mary Ann Hanusa official Iowa General Assembly site
 
 Financial information (state office) at the National Institute for Money in State Politics
 Hanusa's biography at the Iowa House Republicans website

|-

1963 births
21st-century American politicians
21st-century American women politicians
Concordia University Nebraska alumni
Republican Party members of the Iowa House of Representatives
Living people
Politicians from Council Bluffs, Iowa
University of Nebraska–Lincoln alumni
Women state legislators in Iowa